Siphona pauciseta is a Palearctic species of fly in the family Tachinidae.

Distribution
Most of Europe, Russia, Mongolia.

Hosts
Achlya flavicornis.

References

Tachininae
Diptera of Europe
Insects described in 1865
Taxa named by Camillo Rondani